In computer networking, the Link Control Protocol (LCP) forms part of the Point-to-Point Protocol (PPP), within the family of Internet protocols.  In setting up PPP communications, both the sending and receiving devices send out LCP packets to determine the standards of the ensuing data transmission.

The protocol:
 checks the identity of the linked device and either accepts or rejects the device
 determines the acceptable packet size for transmission
 searches for errors in configuration
 can terminate the link if requirements exceed the parameters

Devices cannot use PPP to transmit data over a network until the LCP packet determines the acceptability of the link, but LCP packets are embedded into PPP packets and therefore a basic PPP connection has to be established before LCP can reconfigure it.

LCP over PPP packets have control code 0xC021 and their info field contains the LCP packet, which has four fields (Code, ID, Length and Data).
 Code: Operation requested: configure link, terminate link, and acknowledge and deny codes
 Data: Parameters for the operation

External links 
 : PPP LCP Extensions
 : The Point-to-Point Protocol (PPP)
 : PPP Reliable Transmission
 
Link protocols
Internet Standards